Public Television of Armenia (1TV), also known as AMPTV or ARMTV, is an Armenian public television station that began transmissions in 1956.

History

Early years
Armenia Public Television dates back to September 5, 1955, when the USSR Council of Ministers made the decision to construct 27 programme centres and five transmission stations in the Union Republics. On November 29, 1956, the date of Sovietization of Armenia, the first programme of Armenian television was transmitted.

The official opening of the Armenian television took place on February 9, 1957, as regular programmes began to air. Later that year on August 6, 1957, the first news programme was transmitted, titled the News of the Week. At first the news programme was not periodical, but by February, 1958, the news programme became periodical, which resulted in the creation of the news editorial office.

On October 13, 1957, the State Committee on Radio and Television Programmes of the Council of Ministers of the Armenian Soviet Socialist Republic was formed. According to the decree of the USSR Supreme Soviet issued in December, 1970, The State Committee on Radio transmission and Television was renamed to the All-Union Republican State Committee on Television and Radio Transmission.

In March 1973 the television station began its preparations for the changeover to transmissions in colour. Engineers for a colour mobile station, TV production laboratory, video recording units were obtained to begin this process. On May 1, 1973, the station made its first colour transmission from Lenin Square for the May Day Parade. Initially, the colour programmes were transmitted only from the mobile station, from the large celebrations, concerts, sport events of the country. Starting from 1978 about 50 percent of the programmes of the first and the second Armenian channels were in colour. Starting in August 1973 Armenian Television began broadcasting videotape produced programming, which made 70 percent of the programmes aired in 1978.

In 1978 it became possible to see also the fourth channel of the Central Television in Armenia.

After the Soviet era
As political powers began changing in 1990, the then prime minister, Vazgen Manukyan, appointed Henrik Hovhannisyan, a non-communist, to be the head of the State Department of Television and Radio programmes. He started the reformation of the Armenian television, both in terms of content and structure. Those changes were called to comply with the situation of the Kharabagh Freedom movement, and the breakdown of USSR.

Armenia declared its independence on September 21, 1991. A month later, the president of the country signed the RA Law "On Mass Media". For the first time in Armenia the information system had an opportunity to develop in a free and favourable environment. The freedom of speech and purely national propaganda were predominant for the Armenian television.

The economic crisis of the country seriously influenced the functioning of the National television. Capacity were significantly cut and the quantity of viewers decreased. According to the data of November–December 1993, the statistical TV audience was 27.4%.

In November 1996 the 40th anniversary of the Armenian television was celebrated with festivities. The national television continued to preserve with great difficulty what has been created during the former years. The bulk of the programs were entertainment and comedy programs.

In 1996 the second channel of the Armenian television separated and became a separate program. Robert Mavisakalyan was appointed director of Nork television. Within a short period of time "Nork" was able to attract the attention of the bulk of the audience.

In 1999, Armenian television began broadcasting via satellite, and in 2000, television was restructured and renamed the Public Television Company. The country's legislation at the time required Armenia 1 (Hayastan 1) to broadcast all foreign films and series dubbed into Armenian. It was not until 2005 that the language requirement was raised.

New roads and prospects opened for the Armenian Public Television in 2005. The Armenian Public Television and Radio were recognised full and equal members of the European Broadcasting Union at the 56th General Assembly of the European Broadcasting Union held in Dubrovnik on July 7 and July 8. Becoming an Active Member of the European Broadcasting Union, Armenia gained the right to take part in the Eurovision Song Contest, which during the 50 years had already become a favourite event for the Europeans.

In 2015, the channel acquired a mobile HD station with ten HD cameras and a satellite transmitter, the station came into place thanks to funds from China. On 13 September 2016, the channel switched to HD broadcasts.

Programming

Services
Current
 Armenia 1 (Armenian: Հայաստան 1) (also known nationally as 1TV and The First Channel) – a generalist channel broadcast since November 29, 1956 which has a constitutional obligation to provide citizens the right to receive free political, economic, cultural, historical, scientific, sports, educational, variety and news broadcasts.

Defunct
 , or Norq TV (closed in 1998), previously known as Second Program (1973–1991) and Second Channel (1991–1996) – a generalist channel which was replaced by privately run station Armenia 2 (H2) in 1999
  (English: New Channel) (2001–2008), previously known as H1 Yerevan (2001–2004) – entertainment and music programming, replaced by Ararat
  (2008–2011) – arts and culture programming

Management
 Nerses Kagramanov: Director of Armenian Television (1956–1960)
 Marat Martinosyan: First Creative Director of Armenian Television (1956–1964), Director of Television (1966–1971)

Chair of State Committee

 John Kirakosyan (1966–1969)
 Mavr Davtyan (1969–1970)
 Stepan Poghosyan (1970–1988)
 Emanuel Araksman-Manukyan (1988–1990)
 Henrik Hovhannisyan (1990–1991)

Head of State Department
 Samvel Gevorgyan (1991–1993)
 Tigran Hakobyan (1993–1995)

Executive Directors

 Robert Mavisakalyan (1995–1996)
 Perch Stepanyan (1996–1997)
 Hamlet Gasparyan (1997–1998)
 Tigran Naghdalyan (1998–2000)
 Armen Arzumanyan (2001–2010)
 Gagik Buniatyan (2010–2013)
 Margarita Grigoryan (2013–2020)
 Hovhannes Movsisyan (2020–present)

Logo gallery

See also
Armenia in the Eurovision Song Contest
Media of Armenia
Public Radio of Armenia
Television in Armenia

References

External links

  

Television stations in Armenia
Armenian-language television stations
Publicly funded broadcasters
European Broadcasting Union members
Television channels and stations established in 1956
1956 establishments in Armenia
State media
Commercial-free television networks
Television networks in Armenia